Dingle is a town in County Kerry, Ireland.

Dingle may also refer to:

People with the surname
Adrian Dingle (American football) (1977–2022), American football player
Edward von Siebold Dingle (1893–1975), American bird artist
Edwin Dingle (1881–1972), English journalist
Herbert Dingle (1890–1978), English astrophysicist
Graeme Dingle (born 1945), New Zealand mountaineer
John T. Dingle, British biologist and rheumatologist
Johnny Dingle (born 1984), American football player
Dingle Foot (1905–1978), British lawyer and politician

Fictional characters
"Mr. Dingle, the Strong", a Twilight Zone episode in the 1960–61 season
 Desmond Olivier Dingle, comedic alter ego of English actor Patrick Barlow
 The Dingles, a large family in the British TV series Emmerdale
 Dingle, a character in the American animated series Secret Mountain Fort Awesome
Dingle Godwin, a character in the Swiss TV series "Fascht e Familie"

Geography
 Dingle, a small wooded valley, a type of Dell (landform)

Places in the United Kingdom
 Dingle, Liverpool, a district of the city of Liverpool
 Dingle Road railway station serves the town of Penarth, near Cardiff
 The Dingle, Anglesey, a local nature reserve
 Dingle Dell, a section of track at Brands Hatch motor racing circuit in Kent
 The Dingle, a sunken flower garden in The Quarry park, in Shrewsbury, Shropshire
 The Dingle at Dudmaston Hall, Shropshire
 Badger Dingle in Badger, Shropshire

Elsewhere
 Dingle Lake, a salt-water lake on the Breidnes Peninsula, Antarctica
 Sir Sandford Fleming Park in Halifax, Nova Scotia, Canada, informally known as "Dingle Park"
 Dingle Peninsula, in County Kerry, Ireland
 Dingle, Iloilo, a municipality in Iloilo, Philippines
 Dingle, Sweden, a small town in Munkedal Municipality, Västra Götaland County
 Dingle, Idaho, a small rural town in Bear Lake County, Idaho, United States

See also
 Dingell (disambiguation)
 Dingle Dome (disambiguation)